Grace Wynne-Jones is an Irish journalist and writer.

Life and career
Grace Wynne-Jones was born in Ireland to Joan de Vere (1913-1989) of Curraghchase in County Limerick home of poet Aubrey Thomas de Vere. She grew up in Ireland but also lived in the US, Africa, and the UK. Wynne-Jones has been published by magazines and newspapers in Ireland, Australia and the UK. She wrote a radio play Ebb Tide which was broadcast by the national broadcaster RTÉ. She is currently living in County Wicklow.

Bibliography
Ordinary Miracles (Simon & Schuster/Pocket 1997)
Wise Follies (Simon & Schuster/Pocket 1998)
Ready Or Not? (Tivoli, 2003)
The Truth Club (Tivoli 2005)

References

Irish women writers
Living people
Year of birth missing (living people)